Matthew Joseph Nover (born September 23, 1970) is an American former professional basketball player. He played for C.B. Polaris World Murcia in the Liga ACB and for Sydney Kings in the Australian NBL. In 1994, he appeared in Blue Chips along with Nick Nolte, Penny Hardaway, and Shaquille O'Neal.

Portuguese national basketball team
Nover, who is a naturalized citizen of Portugal, played for the Portuguese national basketball team during the 2003 and 2005 FIBA EuroBasket qualification.

Post-basketball career
Nover is currently a regional sales manager for TELA Bio in Indianapolis, Indiana.

References

External links
Matt Nover at basketball-reference.com
Matt Nover at sports-reference.com
Matt Nover at acb.com
Matt Nover at imdb.com
Profile at Eurobasket.com

1970 births
Living people
20th-century American male actors
American expatriate basketball people in Australia
American expatriate basketball people in Portugal
American male film actors
American men's basketball players
Atléticos de San Germán players
CB Murcia players
Forwards (basketball)
Indiana Hoosiers men's basketball players
Liga ACB players
Portuguese men's basketball players
S.L. Benfica basketball players
Sydney Kings players

Portuguese people of American descent